Dwe (also spelt Dway, born Htin Lin (ထင်လင်း) 7 May 1966 – 11 July 2007) was a Burmese film actor and singer. He  starred in hundreds of films, and was considered one of the most successful actors in Burmese cinema. He is most recognized by audiences as a singer.

Early life and education 
Htin Lin (Dwe) was born on 7 May 1966, in Yangon, Burma, to Tin Htun Maung and Aye Aye Thin. He studied at Basic Education High School No. 1 Dagon for primary and secondary schooling. He later studied at Yangon Institute of Technology and holds a degree in electrical engineering. Dwe was married to Pa Pa Win, also known as Moe Moe. The two had an adopted son, Wai Yan Moe.

Career 
Dwe at first wanted to be a singer before becoming an actor, but unexpectedly, he was approached by his uncle Kyaw Hein to help star in a film while studying at Yangon Institute of Technology which started his career as an actor. He first entered the film industry with his real name Htin Lin (ထင်လင်း), but adopted a stage name, to Dwe in 1993. He worked with Kyaw Hein who directed the drug education film 1993's Dukkha Go Ayaung Hso De (ဒုက္ခကို အရောင်ဆိုးတယ်) and another very famous war movie 1994's Wai Le Mhway Kyway Lae Mhway (ဝေလည်းမွှေး၊ ကြွေလည်းမွှေး). Which became a hit with audiences. Under the guidance of his uncle, Academy Kyaw Hein, Dwe became successful in the film industry and later won the 1997 Myanmar Motion Picture Academy Awards for Best Actor in the Leading Role of 1997's A Mae Chay Yar (အမေ့ခြေရာ). Within just a few years he became a superstar who acted in many popular movies and videos, and shot commercials. The last film he acted in was Kambar Tachan Nya - Night of halved world (ကမ္ဘာတစ်ခြမ်းည) which was not finished, directed by Cho Tu Zaw.

He was also successful in the music industry, releasing over 30 songs which included his solo album Tunlin Gwang Abeba (ထွန်းလင်းခွင့်ပေးပါ) and a series of other albums. He has also appeared in a number of popular music series.

Death 
He was diagnosed with heart disease in 2007. On Wednesday 13 July of the same year around 4:00 pm local time he suddenly died of a heart attack at his home on the Aye Thar Yar Road. Dwe was 42 years old at the time of his death. At 4 am on 13 July, at home, he received virtuous deeds from the Ping Sangha and had a water blessing ritual performed. The cremation took place at 5:00 a.m. at the Yayway Cemetery. He brought back Dwe's ashes and a pagoda was erected at Chaung Wa Monastery. A statue of his eldest son and his Academy Gold Medal were donated by Dwe and are kept in at the Monastery. His uncle, Sayadaw U Kittithara (former actor Kyaw Hein), passed away on 13 July 2020, coinciding with the date of their deaths.

Before Dwe's death he made a painting which was on display from 1 to 6 June 2009, at Azada Hall, 34th Street, Yangon to commemorate the second anniversary of Dwe's death. All 11 of his works, and it's proceeds was donated to a press fund.

Filmography

References 

Burmese male film actors
20th-century Burmese male singers
1964 births
2007 deaths
People from Yangon
Deaths from heart disease